Cook's River was an electoral district of the Legislative Assembly in the Australian state of New South Wales, created in 1941 and named after inner southwestern Sydney's  Cooks River. It was abolished in 1973.

History
Cook's River was created by the 1940 redistribution, in which the district of Arncliffe was abolished, with Cook's River absorbing east Arncliffe and Rockdale absorbing the balance. Cook's River also included the suburbs of Erskinville, Mascot, St Peters and Tempe. Joseph Cahill was the member for Arncliffe and elected to contest Cook's River.

Cook's River was abolished at the 1973 redistribution and was divided between Rockdale and the new district of Heffron. The member for Marrickville, Norm Ryan, stood aside so that Tom Cahill could contest that seat.

Members for Cook's River

Election results

References

Former electoral districts of New South Wales
Constituencies established in 1941
1941 establishments in Australia
Constituencies disestablished in 1973
1973 disestablishments in Australia